Lear Spire is a distinctive pointed spire rising to ,  south of Ugolini Peak, Colwell Massif, in Victoria Land, Antarctica. It was named by the Advisory Committee on Antarctic Names in 1994 after D'Ann Figard Lear of the United States Geological Survey, librarian for the Scientific Committee on Antarctic Research library (Reston, Virginia), which holds an extensive collection of Antarctic photography, maps, and geodetic control data.

References

Rock formations of Victoria Land
Scott Coast